The 2017 Windward Islands Tournament (2017 WIFA Men's Tournament) is an association football tournament scheduled to take place in Grenada. It is organised by the Windward Islands Football Association (WIFA).

Barbados were invited to take part in the tournament. It was the first time in four decades the national team had participated.

Venues

Standings

Matches

Goal scorers

References 

2017 in Grenada
Windward
Windward Islands Tournament
Wind